The Grimaldi Forum in Monaco is a conference and congress centre located on the seafront of Monaco's eastern beach quartier, Larvotto. Les Ballets de Monte-Carlo and the Monte-Carlo Philharmonic Orchestra regularly perform there. This is also the venue of the EVER Monaco exhibition held in March annually.

During the renovation of Salle Garnier in 2004–05, operas were presented at the Salle des Princes in the Grimaldi Forum.

The Grimaldi Forum also hosted the draw for the group stage of the UEFA Champions League and UEFA Europa League until 2019.

References

External links

Convention centers in Monaco
Concert halls in Monaco